The 2000 Pittsburgh Steelers season was the franchise's 68th season as a professional sports franchise and as a member of the National Football League.

The season began with the team trying to improve on their 6–10 record from 1999 in which they failed to qualify for the playoffs. While Pittsburgh did improve to 9–7 and had their first winning season since 1997, it was not enough for the team to qualify for the playoffs. This season also marked the Steelers' last at Three Rivers Stadium.

Coach Bill Cowher named Kent Graham the team's starting quarterback for the season over former starter Kordell Stewart. After a 0–3 start, Graham was injured and Stewart reclaimed the starting job. Graham was released at the end of the season.

Offseason

NFL draft

Undrafted Free Agents

Personnel

Roster
Notable additions include Plaxico Burress, Dan Kreider, Marvel Smith and Clark Haggans.

Preseason

Schedule

Regular season

Schedule

Game summaries

Week 1 (Sunday September 3, 2000): vs. Baltimore Ravens 

at Three Rivers Stadium, Pittsburgh, Pennsylvania
 Game time: 1:00 p.m. EDT
 Game weather: 77 °F (Mostly Sunny)
 Game attendance: 55,049
 Referee: Phil Luckett
 TV announcers: (CBS) Don Criqui (play by play), Steve Tasker (color commentator)

Week 2 (Sunday September 10, 2000): Bye Week 
The Steelers had a record of 0-1 on their bye week.

Week 3 (Sunday September 17, 2000): at Cleveland Browns 

at Cleveland Browns Stadium, Cleveland, Ohio
 Game time: 1:00 p.m. EDT
 Game weather:
 Game attendance: 73,018
 Referee: Bob McElwee
 TV announcers: (CBS) Gus Johnson (play by play), Brent Jones (color commentator)

The low point for the Steelers's season was probably their Week 3 loss to the Browns.  Against a team that would eventually finish 3–13, the usually stout Steelers defense allowed Tim Couch to throw for over 300 yards while failing to sack him once.  Furthermore, the game ended with probably the Steelers's biggest gaffe of the season.

The Browns's woeful offense drove down for touchdowns on each of their first two possessions, giving them an early 14–0 lead.  A four-yard touchdown run by Richard Huntley helped the Steelers to narrow the deficit to 14–10 at the half, and Jerome Bettis's 10 yard touchdown run in the third quarter gave the Steelers a 20–17 lead.  However, a Phil Dawson field goal tied it at 20, and a 79 yard pass from Couch to Kevin Johnson set up a 19-yard chip shot by Dawson to give the Browns a 23–20 lead with 2:48 to go.  With the Steelers needing at least a field goal to force overtime, Kent Graham found Bobby Shaw for a 28-yard completion, then a 20-yard run by Chris Fuamatu-Ma'afala put the Steelers inside the 10-yard line when they called their final timeout with 30 seconds left.  The Steelers decided to go for the win, and Graham spiked the ball before making the worst play of the day.  On third and goal from the six-yard line, Graham dropped back with the Browns pass rush closing in.  Rather than throwing incomplete to stop the clock, however, Graham allowed rookie DE Courtney Brown to sack him, meaning that the Steelers had no way to stop the clock without running another play.  In the ensuing chaos, the Steelers sent out kicker Kris Brown to attempt a game-tying field goal (with Graham as the holder since he was already on the field), and they failed to get their formation set before time ran out, resulting in a loss.

Week 4 (Sunday September 24, 2000): vs. Tennessee Titans 

at Three Rivers Stadium, Pittsburgh, Pennsylvania
 Game time: 1:00 p.m. EDT
 Game weather: 60 °F (Cloudy)
 Game attendance: 51,769
 Referee: Walt Coleman
 TV announcers: (CBS) Ian Eagle (play by play), Mark May (color commentator)

After their humiliating loss to the Browns, the Steelers were in a must-win situation upon returning home to face the Titans.  With Steve McNair suffering a bruised sternum in the Titans's previous game, it would be former Steelers QB Neil O'Donnell getting the start against his former team.

While the defense harassed O'Donnell, who completed less than half his passes (13-27) with three interceptions, the Steelers trailed for much of the game with the team down 13-6 late in the third.  However, Kent Graham completed a 17-yard pass to Hines Ward, who went down just before the goal line.  On the first play of the fourth quarter, Kordell Stewart subbed in for Graham and jumped over the Titans line for the game-tying touchdown.  A five-yard touchdown run by Jerome Bettis made it 20-16 Steelers late.  With three minutes to go, Jason Gildon sacked O'Donnell, knocking him out of the game.  With O'Donnell hurt, Steve McNair, who dressed for the game but was not expected to play with a bruised sternum, came in despite his injury.  All McNair did was drive the Titans down the field in four plays, hitting Erron Kinney for the go-ahead touchdown with 1:31 to go.  On the next play from scrimmage, Graham was hit after completing a 20 yard pass to Chris Fuamatu-Ma'afala and also had to leave the game due to injury, forcing Kordell Stewart to take over at QB.  Although Stewart only went 1–4 on the drive, he did manage to put the Steelers in field goal range with a 16 yard run.  However, kicker Kris Brown's potential game-tying 50-yard field goal was short.

Week 5 (Sunday October 1, 2000): at Jacksonville Jaguars 

at Alltel Stadium, Jacksonville, Florida
 Game time: 1:00 p.m. EDT
 Game weather:
 Game attendance: 64,351
 Referee: Jeff Triplette
 TV announcers: (CBS) Kevin Harlan (play by play), Randy Cross (color commentator), Beasley Reece (sideline reporter)
Steelers get first ever win in Jacksonville.

With Kent Graham out with an injury, Kordell Stewart received his first start of the season coming off losing his starting job after two much-maligned seasons.  However, to the pleasant surprise of the team and the fans, Stewart demonstrated his form of old, completing 10 of 16 passes (albeit for only 132 yards, no touchdowns, and one interception) and running for 61 more.  Jerome Bettis added 97 yards rushing with 2 touchdowns, and the Steelers jumped out to a 24-6 lead.

During the game, rookie WR Plaxico Burress caught a third down pass and went down without being touched.  He spiked the football to celebrate (confusing NCAA rules with NFL rules), but since he was never touched down, the ball remained live (in play) and the Jaguars recovered the fumble with linebacker Danny Clark returning the ball 44 yards to the Steelers' 27 yard line.  In spite of this miscue being one of the worst plays of the NFL season, the Steelers even survived this setback without points.  On 4th and 3 inside the 10, Jaguars coach Tom Coughlin elected to go for it with his team down 18, and Earl Holmes upended Jaguars quarterback Mark Brunell, leaving him a yard short of a first down.

Week 6 (Sunday October 8, 2000): at New York Jets 

at Giants Stadium, East Rutherford, New Jersey
 Game time: 1:00 p.m. EDT
 Game weather:
 Game attendance: 78,441
 Referee: Gerald Austin
 TV announcers: (CBS) Ian Eagle (play by play), Mark May (color commentator)

Week 7 (Sunday October 15, 2000): vs. Cincinnati Bengals 

at Three Rivers Stadium, Pittsburgh, Pennsylvania
 Game time: 1:00 p.m. EDT
 Game weather: 59 °F (Cloudy)
 Game attendance: 54,238
 Referee: Phil Luckett
 TV announcers: (CBS) Don Criqui (play by play), Steve Tasker (color commentator)

Week 8 (Sunday October 22, 2000): vs. Cleveland Browns 

at Three Rivers Stadium, Pittsburgh, Pennsylvania
 Game time: 4:05 p.m. EDT
 Game weather: 70 °F (Sunny)
 Game attendance: 57,659
 Referee: Ed Hochuli
 TV announcers: (CBS) Ian Eagle (play by play), Mark May (color commentator)

Week 9 (Sunday October 29, 2000): at Baltimore Ravens 

at PSINet Stadium, Baltimore, Maryland
 Game time: 1:00 p.m. EST
 Game weather:
 Game attendance: 69,405
 Referee: Bernie Kukar
 TV announcers: (CBS) Ian Eagle (play by play), Mark May (color commentator)

Week 10 (Sunday November 5, 2000): at Tennessee Titans 

at Adelphia Coliseum, Nashville, Tennessee
 Game time: 1:00 p.m. EST
 Game weather:
 Game attendance: 68,498
 Referee: Ron Blum
 TV announcers: (CBS) Gus Johnson (play by play), Brent Jones (color commentator), Marcus Allen (sideline reporter)

Week 11 (Sunday November 12, 2000): vs. Philadelphia Eagles 

at Three Rivers Stadium, Pittsburgh, Pennsylvania
 Game time: 1:00 p.m. EST
 Game weather: 42 °F (Cloudy)
 Game attendance: 56,702
 Referee: Dick Hantak
 TV announcers: (FOX) Kenny Albert (play by play), Tim Green (color commentator)

Week 12 (Sunday November 19, 2000): vs. Jacksonville Jaguars 

at Three Rivers Stadium, Pittsburgh, Pennsylvania
 Game time: 8:30 p.m. EST
 Game weather: 29 °F (Clear)
 Game attendance: 50,925
 Referee: Gerald Austin
 TV announcers: (ESPN) Mike Patrick (play by play), Joe Theismann & Paul Maguire (color commentators), Solomon Wilcots (sideline reporter)

Week 13 (Sunday November 26, 2000): at Cincinnati Bengals 

at Paul Brown Stadium, Cincinnati, Ohio
 Game time: 1:00 p.m. EST
 Game weather:
 Game attendance: 63,925
 Referee: Larry Nemmers
 TV announcers: (CBS) Bill Macatee (play by play), Charles Mann (color commentator)

Week 14 (Sunday December 3, 2000): vs. Oakland Raiders 

at Three Rivers Stadium, Pittsburgh, Pennsylvania
 Game time: 1:00 p.m. EST
 Game weather: 31 °F (Sunny)
 Game attendance: 54,881
 Referee: Tom White
 TV announcers: (CBS) Kevin Harlan (play by play), Daryl Johnston (color commentator)

With an AFC-best 10-2 record heading into Pittsburgh, the Raiders were favored to win the first Raiders-Steelers game in Pittsburgh since 1980.  What instead ensued was a very exciting contest featuring vicious hits, gutsy play, and a game-ending controversy that recalled the glory days of the Raiders-Steelers rivalry in the 1970's.

In the first quarter, Kordell Stewart threw a 19 yard touchdown pass to Bobby Shaw for a 7-0 lead.  However, the Steelers fell behind 17-7 in the second quarter.  An calf injury to Stewart forced him to the sidelines, and in his relief appearance, Kent Graham threw a pass that was intercepted by Eric Allen and returned 27 yards for a touchdown.  Then with 1:06 to go in the half, Rich Gannon found tight end Randy Jordan on a screen pass for a 21 yard touchdown make the score 17-7 Raiders at the half.  In the second half, Kordell Stewart returned to play despite his injury and drove the Steelers down to the Raiders's 6 yard line.  This drive featured a play where Stewart fumbled at his own 14 yard line, but recovered the ball and escaped the Raiders for 17 yards.  On second and goal, Stewart threw a pass in the right flat to tight end Mark Bruener at the 1, when Raiders safety Calvin Branch went into Breuner at full speed and shoved him backwards towards the 5.  Unwilling to be stopped short, Breuner fought back and dragged Branch into the end zone with him just before he could be shoved out of bounds, making the score 17-14. 

On the first play of the fourth quarter, Stewart ran for a 17 yard touchdown for the Steelers to regain the lead, 21-17.  Raiders kicker Sebastian Janikowski kicked a 42 yard field goal to make it 21-20, but with 4 minutes to play, missed another field goal that would have given the Raiders the lead.  The Raiders got the ball back with 1:39 left with one last chance to win the game.  Rich Gannon completed passes to receivers James Jett and Andre Rison for 11 and 14 yards, then found Tim Brown to convert a fourth down at midfield.  The game came down to a controversial call.  The Raiders had a fourth and one at the Steelers' 41 yard line, but the sideline crew was slow to switch the down markers from 3 to 4, so Raiders quarterback Rich Gannon called for a pass out in the flat to fullback Jon Ritchie.  The Steelers blitzed and forced Gannon to throw incomplete, when the Raiders began to challenge their turnover on downs.  Referee Tom White conferred with scorekeeper Charles Heberling to review the down and distance for the previous four plays, and Heberling confirmed that because the previous play was in fact fourth down in spite of what was labeled, the Steelers would be awarded the ball.

During the game, Raiders lineman Regan Upshaw confronted punter Josh Miller after a Steelers punt and spat at him.  While Upshaw was not penalized as the refs did not see the incident, CBS cameras did and Upshaw was fined nearly $30,000 after the game.

On the ESPN highlight show NFL Primetime, rather than being shown and recapped with one of the show's standard themes, the highlights were set to the NFL Films songs "A Golden Boy Again" and "Raiders' Theme" to commemorate the final Raiders-Steelers matchup at Three Rivers Stadium, as well as the final game from Three Rivers they would show a highlight from during a regular edition of the show.

Week 15 (Sunday December 10, 2000): at New York Giants 

at Giants Stadium, East Rutherford, New Jersey
 Game time: 1:00 p.m. EST
 Game weather:
 Game attendance: 78,164
 Referee: Tony Corrente
 TV announcers: (CBS) Greg Gumbel (play by play), Phil Simms (color commentator), Armen Keteyian (sideline reporter)

Just one week after their big win against the Raiders, the Steelers were blown out against the Giants in New Jersey.  The Steelers allowed 333 yards passing from Giants quarterback Kerry Collins, and the Steelers were held to just 47 yards rushing.

The Giants held a 13–3 lead at halftime, and extended their lead to 20–3 after a Collins touchdown pass to Ike Hilliard. 

The Steelers's best play of the game, in fact, came on what appeared to be yet another bad play for the team.  Kerry Collins completed a pass to a wide-open Hilliard, and he cut to the middle of the field, appearing to break free for what would be a 66 yard touchdown when fullback Greg Comella flattened Steelers safety Ainsley Battles on a block inside the 10, but somehow, Battles rolled into position and tripped up Hilliard at the 7 yard line, and a sure Giants touchdown became a field goal to make it 23-3.  Battles's miraculous tackle gave the Steelers one more chance to stay in the game, and Kordell Stewart drove the Steelers inside the 10 yard line, but on fourth and goal, Stewart was intercepted by Reggie Stephens to effectively end any remaining hope the Steelers had.  Collins then drove the Giants down the field and threw an insurance touchdown to Amani Toomer to make it 30–3.

The loss put the Steelers at a major disadvantage in the AFC playoff race.  With the Steelers at 7-7, the Titans having clinched the division, and the Steelers two games behind the #6 wild card spot in the AFC, the Steelers would have to win out and get major help from other teams in order to qualify for the playoffs.

Week 16 (Saturday December 16, 2000): vs. Washington Redskins 

at Three Rivers Stadium, Pittsburgh, Pennsylvania
 Game time: 12:30 p.m. EST
 Game weather: 39 °F (Rain)
 Game attendance: 58,183
 Referee: Mike Carey
 TV announcers: (FOX) Dick Stockton (play by play), Matt Millen (color commentator), Pam Oliver (sideline reporter)

This was the last game at Three Rivers Stadium.

Week 17 (Sunday December 24, 2000): at San Diego Chargers 

at Qualcomm Stadium, San Diego, California
 Game time: 4:05 p.m. EST
 Game weather: Sunny 60° wind 8 mph
 Game attendance: 50,809
 Referee: Bob McElwee
 TV announcers: (CBS) Gus Johnson (play by play), Brent Jones (color commentator)

Heading into the last Sunday of the 2000 season, the Steelers needed a win, a Jets loss, and a Colts loss in order to earn the last available Wild Card berth in the AFC playoffs.  With the Jets losing to the Ravens in a 1:00 game, the Steelers were still alive when their matchup with the 1–14 Chargers started.

Early on in the game, the Chargers demonstrated the potential for an upset bid.  On the Chargers's first play from scrimmage, quarterback Ryan Leaf threw a 71-yard touchdown to Jeff Graham, and while Steelers kick returner Will Blackwell answered with a 98 yard kickoff return for a touchdown on the next play, the Chargers held a 14-7 lead after one quarter with Rodney Harrison returning a Kordell Stewart interception 63 yards for a touchdown.  However, the Steelers scored 17 unanswered points in the second quarter and never relinquished the lead.

Although Stewart's passing statistics were relatively pedestrian (16-32, 190 yards, and 1 touchdown against 2 interceptions), he ran for 91 yards and 2 touchdowns, and the Steelers held the Chargers to less than 200 yards of total offense while sacking Ryan Leaf six times. 

Other than the aforementioned touchdown on the first play, Leaf played poorly as usual, going 15-29 for 171 yards with a touchdown and an interception, giving him only 100 yards passing after his first play.  To top it off, he lost a fumble on the last Chargers possession, which turned out to be his last snap as a Charger.  Following the game, Leaf stormed out of the locker room without speaking with reporters.

Although the Steelers did their part in winning against the hapless Chargers, the Colts got a big break with their matchup against the Vikings.  With the Giants having clinched the #1 seed in the NFC the previous day and the Saints having clinched the NFC West with a worse record than the Vikings, the Vikings could not advance their playoff seed in the playoffs.  As a result, the Vikings rested many of their starters (including Daunte Culpepper and Randy Moss) after the first quarter of their game against the Colts, and the Colts capitalized with an easy 31–10 win.  This result meant that the Steelers would fail to qualify for the playoffs for the third consecutive season.

Standings

References

External links 
 2000 Pittsburgh Steelers season at Pro Football Reference 
 2000 Pittsburgh Steelers season statistics at jt-sw.com 

Pittsburgh Steelers seasons
Pittsburgh Steelers
Pitts